Matag-ob (IPA: [mɐ'tagʔob]), officially the Municipality of Matag-ob, is a 4th class municipality in the province of Leyte, Philippines. According to the 2020 census, it has a population of 17,522 people.

In 1957 the barrios of Santo Rosario, Santa Rosa, Balagtas, San Vicente and Mabini were separated from the municipality of Palompon and constituted into Matag-ob.

Geography

Barangays
Matag-ob is politically subdivided into 21 barangays.

Climate

Demographics

Economy

References

External links
 [ Philippine Standard Geographic Code]
Philippine Census Information
Local Governance Performance Management System

Municipalities of Leyte (province)